Neagle is a surname

List of people with the surname 
Anna Neagle (1904–1986), born Florence Marjorie Robertson, English actress and singer
Denny Neagle (born 1968), baseball player
Jack Neagle (1858–1904), baseball player
James Neagle (1760–1822), British engraver
Jay Neagle (born 1988), Australian footballer
John Neagle (1796–1865), American painter
Lamar Neagle (born 1987), American soccer player
Lynne Neagle (born 1968), Welsh Labour & Co-operative politician
Merv Neagle (1958–2012), Australian footballer
 Michael Neagle, American musician, Monk & Neagle

See also
McGregor Park-Neagle Field or MacGregor Park, park and baseball venue in Houston, home field of the Texas Southern Tigers baseball team
In re Neagle, 135 U.S. 1 (1890), United States Supreme Court decision concerning bodyguards for Supreme Court Justices
Eagle
Gleneagle (disambiguation)
Nagl
Nagle
Neale (disambiguation)
Naegle
Naegelen

Surnames
Surnames of British Isles origin
Surnames of English origin
Surnames of Welsh origin